Murder Is My Hobby is an American radio mystery program that was broadcast on Mutual in 1945-1946. The 30-minute program debuted on October 14, 1945, and ended on July 14, 1946. It was sponsored by Mendaco.

Before Murder Is My Hobby was broadcast nationwide, it was carried on six Don Lee Pacific stations, sponsored by Cystex, beginning in April 1945.

Glenn Langan portrayed Barton Drake, a police inspector and the author of the book Mystery Is My Hobby. Drake combined his professions by collecting material for stories while he solved crimes. Rod O'Connor was the announcer, and Richard Wilkinson was the writer. 

The program was revised and retitled Mystery Is My Hobby. It still featured Drake, but he was a "wealthy mystery writer who works with the police". Episodes of the program were presented as cases from the book Mystery Is My Hobby. A typical opening had Drake saying: "For this week's drama I've selected Case History 127 from my book, Mystery Is My Hobby. I call it 'Death Is a Grain of Sand'". At the end of each episode he gave the case number and title of the next week's episode. The show was first broadcast on Mutual, and from 1949 to 1951 it was syndicated. 

Langhan again portrayed Drake, and Inspector Danton was played by Ken Christy and Norman Field. Charles Lung had the role of Blake's houseboy, Mike. Bruce Buell was the announcer, and Len Salvo provided music. Dave Titus was the director, and Raymond R. Morgan was the producer.

Television
In 1950, Reynolds Productions created a TV version of Mystery Is My Business, also starring Langhan. Titled Mystery Is My Hobby, it debuted on February 17, 1950, on WNBT-TV in New York City. Sponsored by Polaroid TV Filters, the program was recorded via kinescope at KNBH-TV in Hollywood.

References

External links

Logs
 Log of episodes of Mystery Is My Hobby from Jerry Haendiges Vintage Radio Logs
 Log of episodes of ''Mystery Is My Hobby from Old Time Radio Researchers Group

Streaming
 Episodes of Mystery Is My Hobby from LibriVox Audio Books
 Episodes of Mystery Is My Hobby from RedCircle

1940s American radio programs
1945 radio programme debuts
Mutual Broadcasting System programs
Detective radio shows
Syndicated radio programs